The Carabayo (who perhaps call themselves Yacumo) are an uncontacted people of Colombia living in at least three long houses, known as malokas, along the Rio Puré (now the Río Puré National Park) in the southeastern corner of the country. They live in the Amazonas Department of Colombian Amazon rainforest, near the border with Brazil. They share the protected National Park with the Passé and Jumana people.

In the last 400 years, Carabayo people have had intermittent contact with outsiders, including violent attacks by slave traders and rubber extractors, resulting in their retreat from outside groups and increased isolation.

Name
The Carabayo are also known as the Aroje or Yuri people. They are known as the Aroje to the Bora people. Maku and Macusa are pejorative Arawak terms applied to many local languages, and are not specific to Carabayo.

Language

The Carabayo language appears to be a member of the Tikuna–Yuri family.

Legal protection
In December 2011, President Juan Manuel Santos signed legal decree #4633, which guarantees uncontacted peoples such as the Carabayo the rights to their voluntary isolation, their traditional territories, and reparations if they face violence from outsiders.

Notes

Indigenous peoples in Colombia
Indigenous peoples of the Amazon
Hunter-gatherers of South America
Uncontacted peoples